Geranylgeranyl diphosphate diphosphatase (ES 3.1.7.5, geranylgeranyl diphosphate phosphatase) is an enzyme with systematic name geranyl-diphosphate diphosphohydrolase. This enzyme catalyses the following chemical reaction

 geranylgeranyl diphosphate + H2O  geranylgeraniol + diphosphate

This enzyme is involved in the biosynthesis of plaunotol.

References

External links 
 

EC 3.1.7